Siebendörfer may refer to:

 The German name of Săcele, a city in Romania
 The German name of the Seven Villages, a historical region and former administrative district in Romania